Rocha House is a historic site in Los Angeles, California, that was designated Los Angeles Historic-Cultural Monument #13 in 1963. It is located in Reynier Village in Mid-City, Los Angeles.

Originally part of Rancho Rincón de Los Bueyes, the land on which the house sits was conveyed to the son of the owner of Rancho La Brea in 1872. The Rocha House, sometimes called La Casa de Rocha, was built prior to the transfer, in 1865, by Don Antonio José Rocha II. 

The original house has a square “ground plan” and a “gringo stairway”; there have been multiple additions. 

As of 1966, three years after the site was designated a historic-cultural monument, “This quaint landmark, still showing evidence of its romantic past, is the home of a descendant of a descendant of Antonio José Rocha.” It remains a private home.

References

Los Angeles Historic-Cultural Monuments
Mid-City, Los Angeles